Pennsylvania's 16th congressional district is located in Northwestern Pennsylvania. It contains all of Erie County, Crawford County, Mercer County, and Lawrence County, as well as part of Butler County. The district is represented by Republican Mike Kelly.

Prior to redistricting on March 19, 2018, the 16th congressional district was located in the southeastern part of the state, just west of Philadelphia. Previously, Northwestern Pennsylvania was represented by the 3rd congressional district. The Supreme Court of Pennsylvania redrew the district in February 2018 after ruling the previous map violated the state constitution due to partisan gerrymandering. What was the 16th district was modified to become the eleventh district, and the old third district likewise became the 16th, for the 2018 elections and representation thereafter.

Adams County (which includes Gettysburg) was in the district in 1863, at the time of the Battle of Gettysburg and the Gettysburg Address. Democrat Alexander Coffroth was the district's representative at the time.

Recent election results

Member of the U.S. House of Representatives
Source:

U.S. President

Geography

2003-2018
Created after the 2000 Census, the 16th district was composed of a large portion of southern Chester County, most of Lancaster County, and a sliver of Berks County, including the city of Reading. The 16th stretched from the southwestern suburbs of Philadelphia in the east to the Susquehanna River in the west, and north to include areas around Reading.

In 2000, the 16th Congressional District was home to 646,328 residents, according to the U.S. Census, and its population has increased since that year. Residents of Lancaster County made up the majority of the district's population, followed by Chester County and Berks County. The district was one of the Pennsylvania districts accused of being the result of gerrymandering. Before 2018's redistricting, PA-03 was rated a Solid Republican seat by Cook.

Pockets of urban areas exist in and around the cities of Lancaster, Reading, and West Chester.

2019
In February 2018, the Supreme Court of Pennsylvania ruled that the previous map was unconstitutional due to gerrymandering and released a new congressional map. The 16th district was relocated to the northwestern part of the state. The new 16th includes the cities of Erie, Sharon, Hermitage, Butler and Meadville. After redistricting, PA-16 was rated as a likely Republican seat by Cook in 2018. It is not considered a competitive district in 2020.

Counties and municipalities within the district
Butler County: partial; portions of county are in the 15th and 17th district.

Crawford County: Meadville, Titusville

Erie County: Corry, Erie

Lawrence County: New Castle

Mercer County: Farrell, Hermitage, Sharon

List of members representing the district 
The district was created with two seats in 1823

1823–1833: Two seats

1833-Present: One seat

Historical district boundaries

See also
List of United States congressional districts
Pennsylvania's congressional districts

References

 
 
 Congressional Biographical Directory of the United States 1774–present

External links
 Congressional redistricting in Pennsylvania

16
Constituencies established in 1823
1823 establishments in Pennsylvania